Below are the rosters for the UNCAF Nations Cup 2001 tournament in Honduras, from May 23 to June 3, 2001.

Group A

Head coach:  Carlos Humberto Recinos

Head coach:  Ramón Maradiaga

Head coach:  Mauricio Cruz

Head coach:  Mihai Stoichiţă

Group B

Head coach:  Leroy Sherrier Lewis

Head coach:  Alexandre Guimarães

Head coach:  Julio César Cortes

References
RSSSF Archive

Copa Centroamericana squads
squads